David Janer (born May 5, 1973) is a Spanish actor.

Television 

 Laberint d'ombres (2000) - Óscar
 Des del balcó (2001) - Ignasi Costa
 Temps de silenci (2001) - Roger
 Compañeros (2001-2002) - Martín Bermejo
 16 dobles (2002) - Roger Gutiérrez
 De moda (2004) - Carlos
 El cor de la ciutat (2004) - Álex Benito Andrade
 Mesa para cinco (2006) - Raúl, violin teacher
 Mar de fons (2006) - Carles Revert 
 Cuenta atrás (Countdown) (capítulo "Instituto Bretón") - Alfredo Solís, literature professor
 Los hombres de Paco (2007) - Inspector Carlos Pacheco, internal affairs
 Águila Roja (2009–2016) - Gonzalo de Montalvo / Águila Roja

Cinema 

 Atrapa-la (2000), de Dominic Harari y Teresa Pelegri - Bernat
 Anita no pierde el tren (Anita Takes a Chance) (2001), de Ventura Pons - boy supermarket
 L'Escala de diamants (2003), de Jordi Marcos - Sebas
 Iris TV (2003), de Xavier Manich - Ariel
 Entre vivir y soñar (2004), de Alfonso Albacete and David Menkes - Pierre  
 Los girasoles ciegos (The Blind Sunflowers) (2008), de Jose Luis Cuerda - Falangist
 Águila Roja: la película (2011), de José Ramón Ayerra y Daniel Écija - Gonzalo de Montalvo / Águila Roja

Music 

 San Pedro de Revólver

Theatre 

 El manuscrito del teniente.
 La enfermedad de la juventud.
 El sueño de una noche de verano (A Midsummer Night's Dream) (1998-1999).
 Celobert (2002-2004).
 Tape (2004).

Awards and nominations 
Fotogramas de Plata

Premios Protagonistas

TP de Oro

Premios CineyMás

References 

Spanish male television actors
1973 births
Living people
Male actors from Barcelona
People from Granollers
21st-century Spanish male actors